Btooom! (stylized as BTOOOM!) is a Japanese manga series written and illustrated by Junya Inoue. It was serialized in Shinchosha's seinen manga magazine Comic Bunch, where it ran from 2009 until 2018, with its chapters collected into 26 tankōbon volumes. Btooom! follows the adventures of Ryōta Sakamoto, an unemployed and isolated young man who is one of the world's top players in the titular video game. After Ryōta is nominated to participate in the real-life version of the game, he becomes trapped inside it and meets his love interest Himiko, who was his in-game wife. With the help of their fellow players, Ryōta and Himiko must find a way to return home.

An anime adaptation covering the first 50 chapters of the manga was produced by Madhouse and aired in Japan on Tokyo MX from October 4 to December 20, 2012 and was streamed with English subtitles by Crunchyroll. The manga series was licensed for an English-language release in North America by Yen Press. The anime series has been licensed by Sentai Filmworks for an English-language release in North America.

Plot
Ryōta Sakamoto is an unemployed 22-year-old young man who lives with his mother Yukie. He is one of the world's top players of the combat video game called Btooom! One day, he awakes in what appears to be a tropical island, though he does not remember how or why he has been transported there. While wandering around, Ryōta sees someone and calls out for help. The stranger responds by throwing a bomb at him. Ryōta soon realizes that his life is in danger and that he has somehow been trapped in a real-life version of his favorite game. In the game Ryōta meets Himiko, who is another Btooom! player — and Ryōta's in-game wife.

As the series progresses during Iida's investigation with the government agents like Matthew Percier, along with the help from Ryōta's step-father and step-uncle Hisanobu and Mitamura, it is revealed that the developer of Btooom!, Tyrannos Japan, has been associated with the Illuminati-like organization called Schwaritz Foundation, led by Longer Schwart, who is none other than Himiko's biological father, in an attempt to use the players as their test subjects for Project Themis to conquer the entire world through the domination of the virtual world and getting rid of the evidence of their exposed crimes they are currently committing.

It also contains two separate endings on Chapter 121, a good ending, and a bad ending. In the good ending, Ryōta survives and together planning a marriage with Himiko while in the bad ending, Ryōta perishes to sacrifice himself for Himiko and the remaining players to survive the game. Both endings contain the same event after the game in which the victors are called to the HQ of Tyrannos for a victory ceremony and 10,000,000 yen worth reward for each players. Himiko eventually met her father and he reveals her true heritage and implores her to rule the world from shadow alongside him and her chosen half-siblings. Disgusted with her father's action in creating the death game and causing misery and death throughout the world, Himiko detonates the gas bomb, which she hid after making back to the mainland, killing her father and ending his organization for good.

Characters

Main characters

Ryota is a hikikomori, who was forced to play the game after his mother consented.

 / 

Himiko is a high school girl who is also Btooom! player and was Ryōta's in-game wife, though they did not notice this at first. Her real name is Emilia and she is a biological daughter of Lord Longer Schwart, the main antagonist of the series and leader of the Schwart Foundation.

Opponents

Kōsuke Kira is one of the Btooom! players. He is believed to be a three-star player in the world of Btooom!. He was with his father and attorney on the game, until he killed his own father. A yangire, he was arrested for rape and multiple murder. He was sentenced lightly.

Oda is portrayed to be one of the most dangerous Btooom! players. He was once Ryota's friend back in high school, until a recent incident caused them to be expelled.

Ken'ya Uesugi is one of the Btooom! players.

Kaguya is one of the Btooom! players.

Masashi was a Btooom! player and a war veteran. Dislikes using his BIM, preferring to use his knife. Dies after being exploded using Natsume's BIM, and exposed to a corrosive BIM.

Masahito was a doctor who worked at the same hospital as Shiki Murasaki. He blamed her for his failure, and played her feelings while on the island.

Kiyoshi is one of the Btooom! players who speaks in the Kansai dialect. An old man, he initially aligned himself with Ryota.

Hidemi is a selfish and frivolous Btooom! player who joins forces with Nobutaka until he abandons her.

Yoshiaki was a Btooom! player, who was killed by Ryōta after trying to chase and corner him.

Kōsuke's lawyer. Soichi has a large forehead and a fair amount of wrinkles. Suffers from drug addiction. Dies when Sakamoto thrown a BIM on him.

Yoshihisa was one of the Btooom! players and the father of Kōsuke Kira who he abused, only to be killed by his son.

Mitsuo is one of the Btooom! players. He tried to rape Himiko, which made the latter kill him.

Other characters

A player from the previous round of Btooom!, a year and a half prior to the start of the series and a former associate of Masahito. She lost her arm and lived off the island.

Kondō is one of the Btooom! players who constantly spoke his mind and argued with Masashi Miyamoto. Killed by Masashi by slitting his throat.

Misako was a Btooom! player. She was killed by Nobutaka Oda.

A former senpai of Ryōta's who works in Tyrannos Japan.

 Ryōta's mother. Committed suicide after she sold her own son. Depressed due to her own son's NEET habits, and her partner's company is bankrupt.

 Ryōta's stepfather. He learnt that his partner sold her own son and committed suicide, just to give him money.

 A young man Himiko knew and trusted. He was part of a band and convinced Himiko to introduce her friends to them, raping them.

 Formerly the best friend of Himiko. She betrayed Himiko for the money, and she was raped by the group.

 Formerly a friend of Himiko. Betrayed Himiko for money, and her abandoning them.

 Formerly a friend of Himiko. Betrayed Himiko for money, and her abandonment of them.

 A government agent who helps Ryota to expose the dark secret behind Tyrannos Japan's Btooom! "beta test", then led an operation to rescue him along with other remaining Btooom! survivors on behalf of Iida and Hisanobu.

Media

Manga
Junya Inoue began publishing Btooom! in Shinchosha's weekly magazine Comic Bunch in 2009. Comic Bunch ceased publication on August 27, 2010, but returned on January 21, 2011 as a monthly magazine. It was announced in the May 2014 issue of Comic Bunch, released on March 20, that the manga would enter its final arc in the June issue, released on April 21, 2014. Inoue revealed on Twitter that the series will end with the release of its 26th volume, publishing its final chapter in the May issue of Bunch in March 2018. In an unusual twist, the author made two unique endings, providing "the dark" and "the light" versions of the ending, so that the readers are able to choose what protagonist Ryota Sakamoto will do at a pivotal point in the manga's story.

The series is published in tankōbon form by Shinchosha, and has been licensed for release in North America by Yen Press, who released it between February 2013 and August 2018.

Btooom! U-18
With the Btooom! manga ending in 2018, a manga spin-off called Btooom! U-18 was announced in February 2018. The spin-off is written by Hiroki Ito, who is known for Ouroboros and Impossibility Defense (Funouhan). The new manga is a prequel to the main story and launched in the same magazine issue that featured the original manga's light ending.

Volume list
The series has been collected into twenty-six tankōbon volumes as of August 2018. All twenty-six volumes have been published in English, with the final volume published in April 2020. The final chapter was released on March 20, 2018, and the final volume was released on August 9, 2018.

Anime

In June 2012, it was announced that the manga will be adapted into an anime television series by Madhouse, director Kotono Watanabe, and scriptwriter Yōsuke Kuroda. The 12-episode series premiered in Japan on Tokyo MX from October 4 to December 20, 2012 and was streamed with English subtitles by Crunchyroll in North America, UK, Ireland, Australia, New Zealand, Scandinavia, the Netherlands and South Africa. The anime has been licensed for a 2013 home video release by Sentai Filmworks in North America. The opening theme song is "No pain, No game" by Nano and the closing theme song is "Aozora" (アオゾラ) by May'n. The anime covers the first 50 chapters of the manga (up to Volume 9).

At the beginning of November 2019, the company Televisa through BitMe announced the premiere of 3 new series to its program bar, Among those series was Btooom, the same series was released on November 28, 2019 being dubbed 12 episodes in Latin Spanish and distributed by its video game channel and anime bitme by a large part of South America.

Game
In late February 2017, the BTOOOM! game produced by Masato Hayashi was launched and immediately shot to the top of the charts for free game apps. Despite early success, the game stayed in Japan's top five only for several weeks, and by April 2017 Goboiano reported that the app had “fallen below the top 50”. The game was last updated in July 2017 and never received an English port for Android and iOS/iPhone.

Also called Btooom Online, originally developed in 2016, it was a battle royale game, predating PlayerUnknown's Battlegrounds and Fortnite. The original BTOOOM! manga itself also features a fictional battle royale video game. The manga was in turn inspired by the 2000 Japanese film Battle Royale.

Reception
Theron Martin from ANN reviewed the first few episodes by making comparisons with Sword Art Online which has similar plot theme but differs in style and takes a "darker, grittier, and entirely more visceral approach" as well as displaying combat "ingenuity" rather than SAO's "powermongering approach". Despite the similarities, Btooom! has fairly typical weaponry that produces "a novel twist which dramatically shapes the strategic moves of the players in interesting ways" and the character choices that sway the audience's impressions of them. Overall, he praised the consistency of thrilling action scenes, the efforts on developing the protagonist and its effective dramatic, intense moments.

Even though the anime series became popular internationally, the BTOOOM! Blu-ray/DVD discs only sold 338 copies in Japan.

References

External links
  
  
 

2012 anime television series debuts
Action anime and manga
Anime series based on manga
Battle royale anime and manga
Battle royale games
Fiction about death games
Fiction with alternate endings
Madhouse (company)
Seinen manga
Sentai Filmworks
Shinchosha manga
Television shows written by Yōsuke Kuroda
Yen Press titles